John Connors VC (October 1830 – 29 January 1857) was born in Duagh, Listowel, County Kerry, Ireland and was an Irish recipient of the Victoria Cross, the highest and most prestigious award for gallantry in the face of the enemy that can be awarded to British and Commonwealth forces.

Details
Connors was approximately 24 years old, and a private in the 3rd Regiment of Foot (later The East Kent Regiment (The Buffs)), British Army during the Crimean War when the following deed took place for which he was awarded the VC.

On 8 September 1855 at Sebastopol in the Crimea, Private Connors showed conspicuous gallantry at the assault on the Redan in personal conflict with the enemy. He rescued an officer of the 30th Regiment who was surrounded by Russians, by shooting one and bayoneting another.

Further information
He later achieved the rank of Corporal. He died at Corfu 29 January 1857.

There is some doubt as to whether Connors was ever awarded the medal before his death, or whether it reached his widow.

References

Listed in order of publication year 
The Register of the Victoria Cross''' (1981, 1988 and 1997)Ireland's VCs (Dept of Economic Development 1995)Monuments to Courage (David Harvey, 1999)Irish Winners of the Victoria Cross'' (Richard Doherty & David Truesdale; Four Courts, 2000 )

External links
 

1830 births
1857 deaths
Military personnel from County Kerry
Burials in Greece
19th-century Irish people
Irish soldiers in the British Army
Clergy from County Kerry
People from Listowel
Irish recipients of the Victoria Cross
Crimean War recipients of the Victoria Cross
British Army personnel of the Crimean War
Buffs (Royal East Kent Regiment) soldiers
British Army recipients of the Victoria Cross